McAndrews may refer to:

McAndrews, Kentucky
Brian McAndrews, American business executive
James McAndrews (1862–1942), U.S. Representative from Illinois
McAndrews, Held & Malloy, Chicago law firm

See also
McAndrew